The Lopez de Bertodano Formation is a geological formation in the James Ross archipelago of the Antarctic Peninsula. The strata date from the end of the Late Cretaceous (upper-lower Maastrichtian stage) to the Danian stage of the lower Paleocene, from about 70 to 65.5 million years ago, straddling the Cretaceous-Paleogene boundary.

Cretaceous-Paleogene boundary 

The Cretaceous–Paleogene boundary (K–Pg) crops out on Seymour Island in the upper levels of the Lopez de Bertodano Formation. A small (but significant) iridium anomaly occurs at the boundary on Seymour Island, as at lower latitudes, thought to be fallout from the Chicxulub impactor in the Gulf of Mexico. Directly above the boundary a layer of disarticulated fish fossils occurs, victims of a disturbed ecosystem immediately following the impact event. Multiple reports have described evidence for climatic changes in Antarctica prior to the mass extinction, but the extent to which these affected marine biodiversity is debated. Based on extensive marine fossil collections from Seymour Island, recent work has confirmed that a single and severe mass extinction event occurred at this time in Antarctica just as at lower latitudes.

Climate
During the Maastrichtian, Seymour Island was located within the Antarctic polar circle at around ~65°S latitude. Alternatively, a study using data acquired from ancient bacterial membrane lipids yielded a slightly warmer temperature of  around 66 Ma. Nevertheless, these estimated climates characterize primarily cool temperate environments with possible subpolar and warm episodes.

Fossil content 
The Lopez de Bertodano Formation has provided many fossils of flora, dinosaurs and birds. Also the first fossil egg from Antarctica, Antarcticoolithus, was found in the formation.

Dinosaur remains are among the fossils that have been recovered from the formation and include at least two and probably as much as six lineages of indisputably modern birds: one related to waterfowl, a primitive shorebird or related form, 1 to 2 species of possible loons, a large and possibly flightless bird belonging to a lineage extinct today as well as a partial skull that might belong to either of the smaller species or represent yet another one. The formation also contains a rich fossil invertebrate fauna, including bivalves, gastropods, and cephalopods (ammonites and nautiloids).

The fish assemblage of the López de Bertodano Formation was dominated by Enchodus and ichthyodectiformes, accounting for 21.95% and 45.6% of local fish diversity respectively. Of the remaining percentages, sand sharks made up 10.5%, the cow shark Notidanodon 6.8%, chimaeras 3.9%, saw sharks 2.7%, various other teleost fish 2.4%, and the remaining 6% were shared between other sharks like Paraorthacodus, frilled sharks, Protosqualus, and Cretalamna.

Other fossils 
Among others, the following fossils have been found in the formation:

Ammonites
 Diplomoceras cylindraceum
 Gaudryceras seymouriense
 Grossouvrites joharae
 Kitchinites laurae
 Maorites densicostatus
 Pachydiscus (Pachydiscus) ultimus
 Zelandites varuna
 Pseudophyllites cf. loryi

Other invertebrates
 Eutrephoceras dorbignyanum
 Rotularia fallax
 Cyathocidaris nordenskjoldi, C. patera

Flora
 Antarctoxylon juglandoides
 Eucryphiaceoxylon eucryphioides
 Myrceugenelloxylon antarcticus
 pollen

See also 
 Lists of dinosaur-bearing stratigraphic units
 List of fossiliferous stratigraphic units in Antarctica
 South Polar region of the Cretaceous

References

Bibliography

Further reading 
 

Geologic formations of Antarctica
Cretaceous System of Antarctica
Paleogene System of Antarctica
Maastrichtian Stage
Danian Stage
Cretaceous–Paleogene boundary
Siltstone formations
Mudstone formations
Sandstone formations
Deep marine deposits
Turbidite deposits
Ooliferous formations
Paleontology in Antarctica
James Ross Island group